BeatRoute is a monthly print and online magazine published in Western Canada. The magazine is distributed across Alberta and British Columbia, with offices in Calgary and Vancouver. BeatRoute is a primarily music-oriented publication, with a circulation of more than 10,000.

History
BeatRoute was founded by Brad Simm and Glenn Alderson in 2004. Simm also works in the journalism program at Mount Royal University.  

In 2009, BeatRoute began producing a West Coast edition, with an additional 10,000 copies distributed in Vancouver, Victoria and Nanaimo. BeatRoute's British Columbia office has presented and sponsored a multitude of events in Vancouver, including celebrations surrounding the 2018 Juno Awards.

Content
BeatRoute's initial target readership began as a younger age group, but has since expanded. Although primarily focused on music, BeatRoute also publishes articles on art, culture, and film reviews. On occasion, BeatRoute articles have been picked up by larger publications following major concert coverage in Western Canada. In 2018, for example, BeatRoute's feature interview with Arctic Monkeys was cited in multiple international publications including NME and iHeartRadio.

References

External links

2004 establishments in Alberta
Magazines established in 2004
Magazines published in Alberta
Mass media in Calgary
Monthly magazines published in Canada
Music magazines published in Canada